Agniolophia is a genus of longhorn beetles of the subfamily Lamiinae, containing the following species:

 Agniolophia schurmanni Breuning, 1983
 Agniolophia trivittata Breuning, 1938

References

Pteropliini
Cerambycidae genera